Johnny Mauro (October 25, 1910 – January 23, 2003) was an American racecar driver. He was born in Denver Colorado on October 25, 1910. Mauro and his family owned several car dealerships, leading him to being the only Ferrari importer in Denver for many years. He raced in Indy cars for Ferrari in the 1940s and 1950s, and was the mastermind behind the United States Truck Driving School (USTDS), a company still owned by his daughter Arlene and her husband Dick Lammers. When Mauro died in January 2003 in an auto accident, he owned a large collection of cars he had acquired, all of them restored, including a Ford Model A, an Alfa Romeo, a Fiat, a few Mercedes, a quarter midget race car, a Buick, and his prized possession, a red 1984 Ferrari GTO with only a few thousand original miles.

Racing record

Indy 500 results

Complete Formula One World Championship results
(key)

References

Indianapolis 500 drivers
1910 births
2003 deaths
Racing drivers from Denver